Ireland became part of the United Kingdom of Great Britain and Ireland under the Act of Union 1800 from 1 January 1801. On 6 December 1922, the Irish Free State left the United Kingdom, with Northern Ireland remaining as part of the United Kingdom of Great Britain and Northern Ireland.

Summary of constituencies and Members of Parliament
Key to categories: BC - Borough constituencies, CC - County constituencies, UC - University constituencies, Total C - Total constituencies, BMP - Borough Members of Parliament, CMP - County Members of Parliament, UMP - University Members of Parliament.

Electoral effect of the Act of Union 1800

There were 300 seats in the Irish House of Commons in 1800, elected in 150 2-member constituencies: 32 county constituencies, 117 borough constituencies, and one university constituency. Under the Act of Union 1800, Ireland was divided into constituencies to elect 100 MPs for elections to the United Kingdom Parliament. From 1801, there were 32 two-member county constituencies, 2 two-member borough constituencies, 31 one-member borough constituencies, and 1 university constituency.

1801–1832
In cases where both a borough and county area have the same name and seats of each type exist simultaneously Borough, City or County (as appropriate) are included in the constituency name in the list below, unless there is a later county seat of the same name in which case County is omitted.
Borough constituencies: 2 two member, 31 single member; seats 35. 
University constituency: 1 single member seat.
County constituencies: 32 two member; seats 64.
Constituencies: 66.
Members of Parliament: 100.

Irish Reform Act 1832
1832–1870
Overall representation for Ireland increased from 100 to 105 with additional seats in Belfast, Galway Borough, Limerick City, Waterford City and Dublin University gained a second seat. Borough constituencies defined with minor changes by the Parliamentary Boundaries (Ireland) Act 1832. Minor changes in 1868.
Borough constituencies: 6 two member, 27 single member; seats 39. 
University constituency: 1 two member; seats 2.
County constituencies: 32 two member; seats 64.
Constituencies: 66.
Members of Parliament: 105.

Cashel and Sligo Disenfranchisement Act 1870
1870–1885
Cashel and Sligo Borough were disenfranchised for corruption in 1870.
Borough constituencies: 6 two member, 25 single member; seats 37. 
University constituency: 1 two member; seats 2.
County constituencies: 32 two member; seats 64.
Constituencies: 64.
Members of Parliament: 103.

Redistribution of Seats Act 1885

1885–1918
There was a redistribution of constituencies. All seats were single member, except for Cork City and Dublin University, which continued to return two members. Divisions of a borough or county are given in the list below with the name of the borough or county preceding the name of the division. County division compass point names normally have the direction before the county name i.e. East Antrim. The list below treats such names like the borough equivalents, with the name of the place preceding the compass point, i.e. Antrim East.
Borough constituencies: 1 two member, 14 single member; seats 16. 
University constituency: 1 two member; seats 2.
County constituencies: 85 single member seats.
Constituencies: 101.
Members of Parliament: 103.

Redistribution of Seats (Ireland) Act 1918

The general election of 1918 in Ireland was, in British law, to fill the 105 Irish seats in the House of Commons of the United Kingdom for the 31st United Kingdom Parliament. This Parliament first met on 4 February 1919 and was dissolved on 26 October 1922. Sinn Féin elected 69 MPs to 73 seats at this election and under Irish Republican theory, regarded the 1918 election as an all-Ireland election for First Dáil, where they sat as Teachtaí Dála (TDs).

1918–1922
There was a redistribution of constituencies. All seats were single member, except for Cork City and Dublin University, which continued to return two members. From 1918 some former constituency names are reused. Such seats are identified by using (1) or (2) after the constituency name.
Borough constituencies: 1 two member, 19 single member; seats 21. 
University constituencies: 1 two member, 2 single member; seats 4.
County constituencies: 80 single member seats.
Constituencies: 103.
Members of Parliament: 105.

Government of Ireland Act 1920

The Government of Ireland Act 1920 created two separate Parliaments for Northern Ireland and Southern Ireland respectively. It also decreased the representation for Ireland at Westminster from 105 in total to 13 from Northern Ireland and 33 from Southern Ireland.

Independence of the Irish Free State (1922)
In 1921, the Anglo-Irish Treaty secured independence for the Irish Free State, comprising that part of Ireland not in Northern Ireland, which was to take effect on 6 November 1922. From the 1922 Westminster election, held on 15 November, only the six counties of Northern Ireland were represented in Parliament.

1922–1950
There was a redistribution of constituencies, following the Anglo-Irish Treaty and the establishment of the Irish Free State. Twenty-six of the thirty-two Irish counties ceased to be represented in the United Kingdom Parliament. The remaining six counties formed Northern Ireland. All seats were single member, except for Antrim, Down and Fermanagh & Tyrone. Those three seats elected two members each. Some seats included parts of more than one county. The predominant county when the constituency is created is named in those cases.
Borough constituencies: 4 single member seats. 
University constituency: 1 single member seat.
County constituencies: 3 two member, 2 single member; seats 8.
Constituencies: 10.
Members of Parliament: 13.

Representation of the People Act 1948

1950–1983
There was a redistribution of constituencies. All seats were single member ones from this time and the university constituency was abolished.
Borough constituencies: 4 single member seats. 
County constituencies: 8 single member seats.
Constituencies and Members of Parliament: 12.

Increase in Northern Ireland
The House of Commons (Redistribution of Seats) Act 1979 increased representation for Northern Ireland from 12 to 17.

1983–1997
The historic counties ceased to be relevant to constituency boundaries. Seats first created from 1983 are not allocated to a county.
Borough constituencies: 4 single member seats. 
County constituencies: 13 single member seats.
Constituencies and Members of Parliament: 17.

From 1997
There was a redistribution of constituencies.
Borough constituencies: 4 single member seats. 
County constituencies: 14 single member seats.
Constituencies and Members of Parliament: 18.

List of constituencies during the Union with Great Britain
Separate creations of a constituency with the same name is noted by (1) and (2).

List of Northern Ireland constituencies

Historical representation by party
See List of parliamentary constituencies in Northern Ireland for Antrim, Londonderry, Tyrone, Armagh, Down and Fermanagh.

A cell marked → (with a different colour background to the preceding cell) indicates that the previous MP continued to sit under a new party name.

Donegal (4)

Monaghan (2)

Cavan (2)

Galway (5)

Leitrim (2)

Roscommon (2)

Sligo (2)

Mayo (4)

Longford (2)

Louth (2)

King's County (2)

Queen's County (2)

Meath (2)

Westmeath (2)

Carlow (1)

Dublin (8)

Wicklow (2)

Kildare (2)

Kilkenny (3)

Wexford (2)

Clare (2)

Tipperary (4)

Limerick (3)

Kerry (4)

Cork (9)

Waterford (3)

Sources
See List of former United Kingdom Parliament constituencies

Final Recommendations Report: 2018 Review of Parliamentary Constituencies (Boundary Commission for Northern Ireland 2018)

Ireland
Historic Westminster constituencies in Ireland
 
History of Northern Ireland
Political history of Ireland
United Kingdom